Axel Campeol (born 5 March 2000) is an Italian former football player and content creator. He played mainly as a left-back.

Club career
Born in Conegliano and raised in Farra di Soligo, Campeol first started playing football at Union Qdp before joining the youth sector of AC Milan, where he spent most of his junior career and started playing for their Under-19 squad in the 2017–18 season. That team notably included fellow future professional footballers Gabriele Bellodi, Raoul Bellanova, Tommaso Pobega, Marco Brescianini, Jørgen Strand Larsen and Frank Tsadjout.

In August 2018, he moved to Sampdoria, where he spent one more year with the Under-19s, without receiving any call-ups to the senior squad.

On 16 July 2019, Campeol was loaned to Serie C club Vis Pesaro. He subsequently made his professional debut for Vis Pesaro on 25 August 2019, during a game against Südtirol: he started the match and was substituted at half-time. He collected nine league appearances during his first professional season.

On 17 September 2020, the defender was loaned once more, this time to fellow Serie C side Grosseto. In Tuscany, he established himself as a regular starter in the team, which eventually reached the play-offs' quarter-finals before losing to AlbinoLeffe.

However, towards the end of July 2021, Campeol announced his retirement at the age of just 21, quoting his growing disillusion with the world of football as one of the main reasons behind his surprising choice.

International career
Campeol has been a youth international for Italy at different stages.

He was first called up to represent his country in 2015, when he joined the Under-16 squad.

He then took part in the 2017 UEFA European Under-17 Championship (playing in all three games and starting two of them) as Italy was eliminated in group stage.

Finally, he won caps for the Under-18 and Under-19 national teams.

After retirement 
Immediately after retirement, Campeol has kept pursuing a degree in Physical Education at San Raffaele University in Milan: plus, he expressed the desire to give content creation on social media a try, in order to share his personal stories within the world of football.

His first opportunity came just a few months after, when he officially joined the staff of La Giovane Italia (a portal created by journalist Paolo Ghisoni to promote young talents from all over Italy) and took over their YouTube channel.

References

External links
 

2000 births
People from Conegliano
Footballers from Veneto
Living people
Italian footballers
Italy youth international footballers
Association football defenders
U.C. Sampdoria players
Vis Pesaro dal 1898 players
U.S. Grosseto 1912 players
Serie C players
Sportspeople from the Province of Treviso